The 1903 South Carolina Gamecocks football team represented South Carolina College—now known as the University of South Carolina–as an independent during the 1903 college football season. Led by Bob Williams in his second and final season as head coach, South Carolina compiled a record of 8–2.

Schedule

References

South Carolina
South Carolina Gamecocks football seasons
South Carolina Gamecocks football